The 2015-16 season was the 102nd season since the founding of Al Ittihad Alexandria Club in 1914. The club plays in the Egyptian Premier League and the Egypt Cup. The club is one of the oldest Egyptian clubs, celebrating its centenary in 2014 in front of Sporting CP.

Month by month review

July

Finish the Union Club defeats season and put him in 14th place but managed despite the departure of a large number of players the club that wins over the Wadi Degla SC Club Cup in Egypt and went up to meet the winner of the match Zamalek Club and Haras El-Hodood SC.

Current squad

Out on loan

Youth academy squad

In

Summer

Out

Summer

Egypt Cup

References 

Al Ittihad Alexandria Club seasons
Ittihad Alexandria